Sasson (Hebrew: ששון) is a Hebrew name which means happiness, a surname commonly found among Jews of Levantine origin. Notable people with the surname include:

 Jean Sasson (born 1947), American writer
 Or Sasson (born 1990), Israeli judoka
 Steven Sasson (born 1950), inventor of the digital camera
 Talia Sasson, member of the State Prosecution Criminal Department, editor of the Sasson Report
 Eliyahu Sasson (1902–1978), Israeli politician and minister
 Binyamin Sasson (1903–1989), Israeli politician 
 Moti Sasson (born 1947)

See also 
 Sasson Somekh (born 1933), Israeli academic, writer and translator
 Sasson Gabai (born 1947), Israeli actor
 Sasson Jeans, defunct American clothes brand
 Sassoon (disambiguation)